Colour recovery (or colour restoration) is a process which can restore lost colour to television programmes which were originally transmitted from the colour video tape which the original master was recorded on during final production prior broadcast, but for which only black and white copies remain archived. This should not be confused with colourisation, in which colour is artificially added to source material that was always black-and-white (or where no colour information was preserved in the black-and-white copy), or used to enhance poor-quality original sources. Colour recovery is a newer process and is fundamentally different from colourisation. Most of the work has been done on PAL signals due to the BBC, but the concept is not fundamentally restricted to this system.

Colour recovery can be based on combining colour information from lower-quality recordings, or in the case of BBC's new method, the particular effects that are created when colour source material is encoded into the common analogue television format PAL and then played back. In early colour televisions, until the mid-1980s, this could lead to a problem known as dot crawl because the encoding of colour information could interfere with the underlying signal. This causes a form of distortion in the output signal displayed on the screen. This pattern is evident even if the resulting image is recorded on film, even in black-and-white film. Colour recovery looks for these tell-tale patterns and uses them to decode the original colours.

, colour recovery has successfully been applied to episodes of the BBC TV programmes Doctor Who, Dad's Army, Are You Being Served? and The Morecambe & Wise Show.

Background

Due to the well-documented practice of wiping, many original videotape recordings of colour programmes were lost. However, in the case of the BBC, many telerecorded black and white film copies of affected programmes survived. For a variety of technical and practical reasons (for example various incompatible international TV standards, and the then-high cost of videotape over that of film), black and white film copies were the preferred medium for selling programmes overseas. This practice ultimately led to many programmes which were originally made and transmitted in colour only existing in black and white form after the practice of wiping finally ceased.

Methods of colour recovery

From off-air recordings

During the 1970s, various off-air NTSC video-recordings were made by American and Canadian Doctor Who fans, which were later returned to the BBC. Whilst the quality of these early domestic video recordings was not suitable for broadcast, the lower-definition chrominance signal could be retrieved from them. This signal could be successfully combined with the luminance signal from digitally-scanned existing broadcast-quality monochrome telerecordings to make new colour master copies, suitable for broadcast and sales. In the 1990s this method was carried out by the Doctor Who Restoration Team. Several colour Doctor Who serials were subsequently released on VHS. Combining the video-recorded colour signals with the monochrome telerecordings is a non-trivial task, requiring digital processing (for example matching up the different screen sizes of the two recordings). Thus, it wasn't until the early 1990s that cheaply available, sufficiently powerful computer hardware and software made this task particularly practical at that time.

From chroma crawl

Black & white TV systems predate colour, and so subsequent analogue colour broadcast systems have been designed with backwards-compatibility in mind (known as a compatible colour system). Thus, the chrominance (colour) signal is typically 'shoe-horned' into the same channel as the luminance (brightness) signal, modulated on a fixed frequency, known as the colour subcarrier. Black and white televisions do not decode this extra colour information in the subcarrier, using only the luminance to provide a monochrome picture. However, due to limited bandwidth in the video channel, the chrominance and luminance signals bleed into each other considerably, resulting in the colour information showing up visibly as chroma crawl, or chroma dots on black & white TV sets. This is normally considered a nuisance in analogue broadcasting. However, since telerecordings were made from black & white TV screens and technicians at the time often decided not to apply a filter to remove this interference, these patterns are retained even in the existing monochrome film prints and theoretically contain the original colour information.  (Occasionally the colour information was filtered out using a notch filter and is lost.)  The idea to recover this information was originally suggested by BBC researcher James Insell.

In practice however, the recovery of this colour information from telerecordings is highly complex for several reasons. Firstly, the colour reference timing signal, known as the colour burst, is absent from telerecordings, as it is nominally off the edge of the visible screen area being recorded. This timing has to effectively be recovered since the phase of the chroma dots, which is represented by their horizontal position on the screen, determines the hue of the reconstructed colours. Due to the alternating property of PAL, it is possible to narrow the colours down to 4 possibilities, requiring much less guesswork compared to e.g. NTSC. Distortions in the geometry of the telerecordings due to the nature of physically recording from a non-flat CRT screen onto film means that a transformation has to be applied in order to infer the original positions of the chroma dots within the broadcast.

However, these technical obstacles were finally overcome in 2008, and software written by developer Richard Russell at the informal Colour Recovery Working Group was put to use, finally resulting in the broadcast and release of colour-recovered episodes of Dad's Army and Doctor Who, and subsequently two episodes of The Morecambe & Wise Show as well as the "Party Political Broadcast (Choreographed)" sketch from Monty Python's Flying Circus

Example of the chroma dot reconstruction:

See also

Reverse Standards Conversion

References

External links
  A visual comparison showing the resulting differences between traditional colourisation and Colour recovery
 Pictures of a Marconi quick-pull-down 16mm Film Recorder of the kind used to record Dad's Army and Are You Being Served

Film and video technology